Jojobera is a town and neighbourhood of Jamshedpur, East Singhbhum district, Jharkhand, India. As a neighbourhood of Jamshedpur, it came under Telco Colony.

Economy 
Jojobera Power Plant is a coal-based thermal power plant located at Jojobera. The power plant is owned by Tata Power. It has an installed capacity of 547.5 MW (1x67.5 MW, 4x120 MW). The plant has been supplying power to Tata Steel.

References 

Jamshedpur
Neighbourhoods in Jamshedpur